Secret Summer is the sixth and final extended play (promoted as fifth Korean-language EP) by South Korean girl group Secret. The album was released on August 11, 2014, and contains six tracks. The album came in 2 versions, one pink and one blue.

This was Secret's final album before their disbandment in 2018.

Release and promotion
The lead single, "I'm in Love", was released on August 11, 2014. The official music video was unveiled on the same day. The song was written and produced by Duble Sidekick, and marked a return to their sexy and powerful inspired songs such as "Magic", "Madonna", "Love Is Move" and "Poison".

Secret promoted "I'm in Love" as well as "U R Fired" and "Could Do Better" on music shows in August 2014 on KBS's Music Bank, MBC's Show! Music Core, SBS's Inkigayo and Mnet's M! Countdown. They also held a MelOn showcase on the day of album release.

Track List

Charts

Album chart

Sales

Release history

References

External links
 "I'm in Love" Music Video

2014 EPs
Secret (South Korean band) EPs
Korean-language EPs
Kakao M EPs
TS Entertainment EPs